Motorola Rizr (styled RIZR) is a series of slide mobile phones from Motorola, and is one of the series in the 4LTR line. The first model was released in late 2006. It is a sliding phone (in the style of competing Samsung and LG phones), where the numeric keys are hidden beneath the screen of the phone when closed.

Z3

The Motorola Rizr Z3 was released in July 2006.

Design and appearance
The Rizr Z3 uses a technical form factor, where the user can push on a plastic push bar located under the screen in order to open the phone. When opened, the top portion slides upwards, revealing the standard keys (including numeric, star, and pound keys). These keys are covered when the phone is closed, but the remaining keys, including the side keys, can be used normally once the keypad is unlocked; such keys can be set to automatically lock shortly after the device is closed to prevent accidental activation when in a purse or pocket.

It also has 2 mini lights, located at either side of the Motorola logo above the screen. The mini light on the left (from the user's  point of view) is a green charging light, which displays when the phone is charging and the mini light on the right (again also from the POV) is a blue bluetooth light displayed in periods when connected to an audio device (e.g. bluetooth headset, earpiece etc.) or flashes rapidly for a short time when another bluetooth device requests a file transfer. One of the primary uses of the device when closed is as a landscape still or video camera. When operating in landscape mode, the user holds the phone on its side (90 degrees counter-clockwise), such that the camera key is positioned near the right index finger. The screen text and icons are also rotated, so that they appear normally when held in this fashion. This gives the impression of the phone being more like a traditional camera.

The Rizr Z3 is available in three colors, black, blue, and pink (as a T-Mobile Online Exclusive).

A chronic problem of the center select button cover falling off was reported by many users, although the button cover is not necessary for the button to work. Another problem found is that when charging the phone when it is shut down, and then the charger is taken out, it makes the charging noise louder than usual, even when the phone is in silent mode. Other than these two problems, the phone has received accolades for its good call quality and solid construction, despite reports of instability of the Motorola OS.

Technical specifications
 Advanced Speech Recognition: yes
 Bands: GSM 850/900/1800/1900
 Music Player: MP3 (MPEG-3), MIDI (Musical Instrument Digital Interface), WAV (Wave), IMY (IMELODY), AAC files
 Downloadable: Themes, Wallpaper, Sounds, Ringtones, Java Games
 Instant Messaging: Yes
 Calculator and Currency Converter: Yes
 Calendar: Yes
 Talk Time: Up to 3.3 hours
 Standby Time: Up to 9.4 days
 Dimensions (H x W x D): 4.15 x 1.79 x 0.62 in
 Camera: 2.0 MP camera with LED Flash
 Removable Memory: MicroSD
 Speakerphone: Yes
 Weight: 3.92 oz
 Operating System: P2K
 Bands : Quad Band Use In Abroad Also

Additional features
 Instant messaging (Wireless Village, AIM, ICQ, Windows Live Messenger, or Yahoo! Messenger)
 Bluetooth stereo A2DP support
 MMS, Wireless Village instant messaging and e-mail
 Motorola SCREEN3 push technology for dynamic news and content
 MPEG-4 video and JPEG still image capture (with landscape viewfinder)
 Push to Talk over Cellular (PoC) and Push to view (PTV) capable
 Ringlights (phone lights flash when certain events occur i.e. incoming call)
 Video recorder
 2.0-megapixel camera

Z6c

The Rizr Z6c, also known as the Moto Z6c, was released in December 2007. It features CDMA2000 and GSM network capability in one device. It is offered in the United States by the Verizon Wireless network.  It shares the same slider form factor as the Rizr Z3 (see above).

Along with the BlackBerry 8830 World Edition, this is only one of two devices offered by Verizon Wireless that will work outside of North America. Unlike the BlackBerry, the device features no GSM data protocols, rendering it usable only as a cell phone with SMS capability whilst on the GSM network.

When opened, the top portion slides upwards, revealing the standard keys (including numeric, star, and pound keys). These keys are covered when the phone is closed, but the remaining keys, including the side keys, can be used normally once the keypad is unlocked; such keys are automatically locked shortly after the device is closed to prevent accidental activation when in a purse or pocket.

One of the primary uses of the device when closed is as a landscape still or video camera. When operating in landscape mode, the user holds the phone on its side (90 degrees counter-clockwise), such that the camera key is positioned near the right index finger. The screen text and icons are also rotated, so that they appear normally when held in this fashion. This gives the impression of the phone being more like a traditional camera.

Technical specifications
 Predictive Text: iTAP
 Downloadable: VCast/Mobile Web/Get it Now (Verizon Services)
 Messaging: SMS/MMS/Instant Messaging
 Calculator: Yes
 Calendar: Yes
 Navigation: LBS-powered
 Usage Time: 295 minutes
 Standby Time: Up to 375 hours
 Speakerphone: Yes

Z6cx
Motorola also manufactured a similar version to the Z6c for Verizon Wireless, known as the Z6cx, which omits the camera. Certain government offices do not allow its employees to have cameras on its phones, so manufacturers release non-camera versions of their popular devices. This was the case with the Z6cx.

Z6w
The Motorola Z6W was introduced at 2008's Mobile World Congress. It is a slightly modified version of the Motorola ROKR Z6, but it features an improved user interface and Wi-Fi. The phone was available to carriers in the first half of 2008.

Z6tv

September 2007 saw the release of the Rizr Z6tv, a Verizon Wireless exclusive phone for the US. The EV-DO slider has 2 inch QVGA display, 2.5mm stereo jack, Stereo Bluetooth, microSD slot and multimedia player for music and videos. The device was one of the first Verizon devices to come with its V CAST Mobile TV application pre-loaded, which allowed users to play popular American TV shows.

Z8

The Z8 came in July 2007. Until the release of its successor, the Z10 (see below), it was Motorola's flagship smartphone. The successor to the Rizr Z3 and ROKR Z6, it was released in the United Kingdom on July 9, 2007. Although it was released throughout Europe and Asia shortly thereafter, the phone was not released in either the United States, Canada, or Australia.

Basics
The Rizr Z8 is a UIQ 3 "kick-slider" 3G phone based on Symbian OS. This means that it is a slider-type phone but with a hinge allowing it to bend so as to conform better to the user's face while in use as a handset.

The phone features a 2-megapixel camera, a 16 million color QVGA display, Bluetooth 2.0 with A2DP, a 3.6 Mbit/s HSDPA connection, an EDGE class 10 connection, and 90 megabytes of internal memory. The internal memory is expandable to 32 gigabytes using high-capacity microSDHC (TransFlash) cards.

Release

United Kingdom
In the UK, the Rizr Z8 was available exclusively on Vodafone for the first few weeks of its launch; O2 began offering the phone later; Currently Orange UK is testing the handset in preparation for the Christmas rush of new handsets, they claim if successful it will be available late November. Additionally, both Motorola direct and resellers offer a SIM-free, unlocked version of the phone for use on other networks. All versions of the Rizr Z8 released in the United Kingdom come with a free microSD card containing a copy of the motion picture The Bourne Identity.

United States, Canada, and Australia
Motorola did not release the phone in the US, Canada, or Australia, but it did register the phone with the US FCC, thereby approving it for use in the USA. As a result, many American specialty phone stores carry the phone, and Americans, Canadians, and Australians can order unlocked versions of the Z8 from a variety of websites, including both Motorola's UK website and eBay. An unlocked Z8 purchased outside the US, Canada, or Australia can be used on any GSM network in those countries simply by inserting the user's SIM card. Z8s with foreign SIM cards also are capable of roaming on any those countries' GSM networks.

Specifications
The complete Motorola Rizr Z8 list of specifications are:

Z9
The Motorola Z9 was announced in April 2008 at CTIA and available shortly afterwards. It's a 3G slider phone with GPS and a 2.4" QVGA screen. The Z9 features Stereo Bluetooth, an improved Motorola user interface, and up to 8GB microSDHC support.

The phone was released in the United States as an AT&T carrier exclusive, where it came pre-loaded with its AT&T Navigator application with a-GPS support. The device was also available through Movistar in Venezuela.

Z9n
The Z9n is an updated version of the original Z9. According to Motorola, this updated Z9 brings new media and location applications for users. Just like the original Z9, the Z9n was an AT&T exclusive in the United States.

Z10

The Z10 was the successor to the Z8 (see above) and was Motorola's flagship mobile phone at the time. Motorola released the Z10 in June 2008 in Europe and Asia. Additionally, it had been rumored that in the United States, carrier T-Mobile would release the phone in 2008 to introduce its new 3G UMTS/HSDPA network, however, this never happened.

Basics

Like the Z8, the Z10 is a UIQ 3 "Kick-Slider" 3G phone based on Symbian OS. "Kick-Slider" means that it is a slider-type phone but with a hinge allowing it to bend so as to conform better to the user's face while in use as a handset. The Z10's revamped design changes the Z8's green lining to silver.

The Z10 has many of the same specifications as the Z8. These include a 16 million color QVGA display, Bluetooth 2.0 with A2DP, quad-band GSM, a dual-band 3.6 Mbit/s HSDPA connection, an EDGE class 10 connection, and 77 megabytes of internal memory. The internal memory is expandable to 32 gigabytes using High Capacity microSDHC  cards, although currently only cards up to 16 gigabytes have been released by SanDisk.

Certain Z8 features, however, have been enhanced in the Z10, and new features have been added. The Z10 is 12 grams lighter. It features an upgraded camera module (3.2 megapixels with autofocus). The phone is powered by Symbian OS 9.2 UIQ 3.2. The phone suffers from being slow and often has many errors which require the phone to reboot itself. As yet there has been no software update designed to fix the errors.

Additionally, the Z10 has the ability to view Macromedia Flash in webpages (including videos). It comes with comprehensive video editing software which also allows the user automatically to upload videos to various online video servers such as YouTube and Google Video.

Specifications
The complete Motorola Rizr Z10 list of specifications are:

Worldwide availability
Although Motorola has not issued an official press release, the MotoRizr has been appearing unbranded on auction websites and import cellular phone companies around the world.

European release
On November 11, 2006, the MotoRizr began appearing on several German carrier websites.

On December 1, 2006, the black version of the Rizr was released in the UK.

Asian release
On December 1, 2006, the black MotoRizr was released in Singapore on carrier Singtel.
Just before the end of the year 2006, all colors of the MotoRizr phone were released in Hong Kong.
On January 1, 2007 it was released in India.

U.S. release
T-Mobile officially made the phone available in U.S. stores on March 21, 2007.

See also
 Motorola Razr
 Motorola Krzr
 Motorola Rokr
 Motorola Ming

Notes

References

Sources

External links

 Motorola Official RIZR Z3 site

RIZR Z03
Mobile phones introduced in 2006
Symbian devices